Carapelle is a town in to the province of Foggia, Apulia, Italy.

Carapelle may also refer to:
 Carapelle Calvisio, town in the province of L'Aquila, Abruzzo, Italy
 Carapelle (river), river in the province of Foggia, Apulia, Italy

See also 

 Carapelli